Solway railway station is a suburban railway station serving Solway and the southern end of Masterton, New Zealand. The Wairarapa Connection serves the station several times daily with services to Wellington and Masterton. The station has a single track served by a four-car platform on the Ngaumutawa Road side.

As part of the Wairarapa station upgrade programme to prepare stations for the SW-class passenger carriages, this station was upgraded between 14 May 2007 and late August 2007.

History 
When the station was opened along with the line to Masterton on 1 November 1880 it had only a shelter and platform.  It was originally named Kurupuni and was located south of Masterton.  Later, the station was briefly known as Purakau between 1908 and 1912 when it was renamed Solway.  The station was never regarded as being of any great importance but did also handle freight until 1986 with customers including the Wairarapa Electric Power Board and a fertiliser company.

A new car park was built at the station in 2001 by the Masterton District Council as part of a regional programme to "Enhance and expand urban public passenger transport facilities and services".

In 2006 it was proposed that the historic Class 6 station shelter shed at Solway be removed to a fenced yard at Carterton Station to make way for a new shelter and the platform improvements.  After concern was expressed by local residents the plan was rescinded.

Footnotes

External links
 Passenger timetables from Metlink and Tranz Metro.

Masterton
Rail transport in Wellington
Public transport in the Wellington Region
Buildings and structures in the Wairarapa
Railway stations in New Zealand
Railway stations opened in 1880